= Di Da Di (And So the Story Goes) =

Single by Maria Montell

from the album And So The Story Goes...
- B-side: "Remix"
- Released: 1997
- Genre: Europop; bossa nova; house
- Length: 3:30
- Label: Epic
- Songwriter: Maria Montell
- Producer: Morten Remar

Maria Montell singles chronology
"Hvor Længe" (1995)	"Di Da Di (And So the Story Goes)" (1997)	"You Could Be Mine" (1997)

Music video
- "Di Da Di (And So the Story Goes)" on YouTube

"Di Da Di (And So the Story Goes)" is a song written and performed by Danish singer-songwriter Maria Montell, released in 1997 by Epic Records as the first single from the singer's second album, And So the Story Goes (1997). It was produced by Morten Remar and originally released in Danish in 1996, as "Imens hun sang (Di Da Di)" ("While She Was Singing (Di Da Di)". The song was re-released worldwide with the new title "Di Da Di (And So the Story Goes)" and later just as "Di Da Di". Outside Denmark, it is Montell's most successful song and a huge hit in Spain, where it peaked at number five. It was also a hit in Belgium, Estonia, Finland, Greece, and Iceland. There has been sold 1,8 million singles of the song.

== Track listing ==
- CD single, Denmark (1996)
1. "Imens hun sang (Di Da Di)" — 3:14
- CD single, Denmark (1997)
1. "And So the Story Goes..." (Original Version) — 4:19
2. "And So the Story Goes..." (Adventure Mix) — 3:51
3. "And So the Story Goes..." (Rising Sun Adventure Mix) — 6:07
- CD single, Denmark (1997)
1. "Di Da Di (And So the Story Goes...)" — 4:21
2. "Di Da Di (Una Historia Mas...)" — 4:21
- CD maxi, Denmark (1997)
1. "Di Da Di" (And So the Story Goes...)" — 4:21
2. "Di Da Di" (Una Historia Mas)" (Radio Edit) — 3:27
3. "Di Da Di" (Alternative Radio Mix) — 3:20
4. "Di Da Di" (12" Club Mix) (Radio Version) — 5:20
5. "Di Da Di" (Alternative Radio Mix) (Spanish) — 3:20
6. "Di Da Di" (12" Club Mix) (Radio Version – Spanish) — 5:14

== Charts ==
Chart (1997)	Peak position
Belgium (Ultratop 50 Flanders)	50
Estonia (Eesti Top 20)	7
Finland (Suomen virallinen lista)	16
France Airplay (SNEP)	21
Iceland (Íslenski Listinn Topp 40)	35
Spain (AFYVE)	5
